Kim Jong-cheol (born 25 October 1935) is a South Korean sprinter. He competed in the men's 100 metres at the 1960 Summer Olympics.

References

1935 births
Living people
Athletes (track and field) at the 1960 Summer Olympics
South Korean male sprinters
Olympic athletes of South Korea
Place of birth missing (living people)
20th-century South Korean people